The 1972 Delaware Fightin' Blue Hens football team represented the University of Delaware as an independent during the 1972 NCAA College Division football season. Led by seventh-year head coach Tubby Raymond, Fightin' Blue Hens compiled a record of 10–0. The team the played home games at Delaware Stadium in Newark, Delaware. 

Following their undefeated season, they were named NCAA College Division national champions in both the AP writers' poll and the UPI coaches poll. For the fifth straight year, they also won the Lambert Cup as the best football team from a mid-sized college in the East.

Schedule

References

Delaware
Delaware Fightin' Blue Hens football seasons
NCAA Small College Football Champions
College football undefeated seasons
Delaware Fightin' Blue Hens football